The Wagon Wheel Show – Live is the second live album by English-Irish country singer Nathan Carter. It was released in Ireland on 3 March 2014. The peaked at number 1 on the Irish Albums Chart.

Track listing

Charts

Release history

References

2014 live albums
Nathan Carter albums